Senator Quarles may refer to:

Joseph V. Quarles (1843–1911), U.S. Senator from Wisconsin
Tunstall Quarles (1770s–1855), Kentucky State Senate
William Andrew Quarles (1825–1893), Tennessee State Senate